Laoting County, often mispronounced as Leting County in accordance with the alternative frequently used Mandarin pronunciation, is a county in the northeast of Hebei province, People's Republic of China, facing the Bohai Sea to the east and south. It is under the administration of Tangshan City.

Geography and climate
Laoting has a monsoon-influenced humid continental climate (Köppen Dwa), with four distinct seasons and some maritime moderation during the summer. With the monthly percent possible sunshine ranging from 45% in July to 65% in October, the area receives 2,588 hours of bright sunshine per year. A majority of the annual rainfall occurs in July and August alone.

Administrative divisions
The county administers 1 subdistrict, 11 towns and 3 townships.

Subdistricts:
Chengqu Subdistrict

Towns:
Laoting, Tangjiahe, Hujiatuo, Wangtan, Yangezhuang, Matouying, Xinzhai, Tingliuhe, Jianggezhuang, Maozhuang, Zhongbao

Townships:
Panggezhuang Township, Daxianggezhuang Township, Guhe Township

References

External links
 Laoting County People's Government

 
County-level divisions of Hebei
Tangshan